Saranaca apicalis is a species of ichneumon wasp in the family Ichneumonidae.

References

External links

 

Ichneumoninae
Insects described in 1877
Taxa named by Ezra Townsend Cresson